Allographa leptospora is a species of script lichen in the family Graphidaceae. The lichen was first formally described in 1921 by Finnish lichenologist Edvard August Vainio as Graphis leptospora. The type specimen was collected in 1904 by German botanist Carl Curt Hosseus on Doi Suthep (Chiang Mai Province, Thailand), where it was found growing on tree bark. Hosseus sent this and other lichens collected from Thailand to Vainio for identification. Robert Lücking and Klaus Kalb transferred it to the genus Allographa in 2018. In 2016, the lichen was reported from the Sintra Mountains, Portugal, which was its first documented occurrence in Europe.

Allographa leptospora has a whitish thallus with thick, striated lirellae. Its ascospores, which have up to 15 septa, typically measure 40–75 by 8.0–9.5 μm.

References

leptospora
Lichen species
Lichens of Asia
Lichens of Southwestern Europe
Lichens described in 1921
Taxa named by Edvard August Vainio